East Brooklyn is a village in Grundy County, Illinois, United States. The population was 106 at the 2010 census.

Geography
East Brooklyn is located at  (41.172464, -88.265729).

Demographics

As of the census of 2000, there were 123 people, 46 households, and 33 families residing in the village. The racial makeup of the village was 95.12% White, 0.81% Asian, 2.44% from other races, and 1.63% from two or more races. Hispanic or Latino of any race were 2.44% of the population.

There were 46 households, out of which 37.0% had children under the age of 18 living with them, 71.7% were married couples living together, and 26.1% were non-families. 23.9% of all households were made up of individuals, and 13.0% had someone living alone who was 65 years of age or older. The average household size was 2.67 and the average family size was 3.24.

In the village, the population was spread out, with 29.3% under the age of 18, 3.3% from 18 to 24, 32.5% from 25 to 44, 22.8% from 45 to 64, and 12.2% who were 65 years of age or older. The median age was 34 years. For every 100 females, there were 75.7 males. For every 100 females age 18 and over, there were 93.3 males.

The median income for a household in the village was $40,000, and the median income for a family was $47,500. The per capita income for the village was $21,470. There were 8.3% of families and 12.7% of the population living below the poverty line, including 14.7% of under eighteens and none of those over 64.

References

Villages in Grundy County, Illinois
Villages in Illinois